Andhra Pori ("Andhra Girl") is a 2015 Indian Telugu-language film starring Akash Puri and Ulka Gupta. 

The Andhra Association of Telangana petitioned the court against the film's title, arguing that the word pori is an "objectionable word to degrade the self-respect of the girl". The court dismissed the plea. The film is an official remake of 2014 Marathi film Timepass starring Prathamesh Parab and Ketaki Mategaonkar which was based on author Shaiju Mathew's novel Knocked Up that released in 2010.

Plot 
Narsingh is a boy from Telangana who gets kicked out after failing his schooling. He meets Prashanthi, the daughter of a rich man, and falls in love. He calls Prashanthi "Andhra Pori", which means girl from Andhra, and the film covers their relationship and family drama.

Cast 
Akash Puri as Narsingh
Ulka Gupta as Prashanti 
Arvind Krishna
Poornima
Uttej
Eshwari Rao

Soundtrack

References 

2010s Telugu-language films
2015 films
Telugu remakes of Marathi films
Romance film remakes
Indian romantic drama films